Jaffrea is a genus of shrubs in the family Rhamnaceae. The genus is  endemic to New Caledonia in the Pacific and contains two species that were first described in Alphitonia. It is related to Emmenosperma.

The genus name of Jaffrea is in honour of Tanguy Jaffré, French botanist working at Institut de recherche pour le développement in Nouméa of New Caledonia in Oceania.

List of species
Jaffrea erubescens 
Jaffrea xerocarpa

References

Endemic flora of New Caledonia
Rhamnaceae
Rhamnaceae genera